A modem sharing device (MSD), also commonly known as a line sharing device (LSD), modem sharer, or line sharer, allows multiple devices to share a serial connection.  Only multipoint serial protocols such as Bisync are supported.  Both synchronous and asynchronous datastreams can be used.  A common example would be a Tandem as host connected to multiple automatic teller machines often with a modem or Cisco router in-between.

Networking hardware